Die Ärzte früher!/Der Ausverkauf geht weiter! [Die Ärzte earlier!/The sellout continues!] is the ninth album by German rock band Die Ärzte. It is a compilation of their early material (1982–1983), including the songs from Zu schön, um wahr zu sein! and Uns geht's prima.... It was released after they broke up.

Track listing 
 "Teenager Liebe (echt)" [Teenager love (authentic)] – 2:58
 "Anneliese Schmidt" – 3:11
 "Der lustige Astronaut" [The merry astronaut] – 2:29
 "Die Einsamkeit des Würstchens" [Loneliness of the sausage] – 1:32
 "Ekelpack" [Disgust pack] – 2:04
 "Grace Kelly" – 2:19
 "Kopfhaut" [Headskin] – 2:48
 "Mein kleiner Liebling" [My little darling] – 2:26
 "Sommer, Palmen, Sonnenschein" [Summer, palms, sunshine] – 2:50
 "Teddybär" [Teddy bear] – 2:47
 "Tittenmaus" [Tit mouse] – 5:05
 "Vollmilch" [Whole milk] – 1:54
 "Wilde Mädchen" [Wild girls] – 1:20
 "Zitroneneis" [Lemon ice cream or Lemon popsicle] – 2:16
 "Zum Bäcker" [To the baker] – 2:08
 "Teenager Liebe (unecht)" [Teenager love (fake)] – 3:18

Song information
Tracks 1, 2, 6, 10 from the EP Zu schön, um wahr zu sein!
Tracks 3, 7–9, 16 from the EP Uns geht's prima...
Tracks 12, 14, 15 from the compilation Ein Vollrausch in Stereo – 20 schäumende Stimmungshits
Tracks 4, 5 from the compilation Pesthauch des Dschungels; "Die Einsamkeit des Würstchens" as Die Ulkigen Pulkigen under the title "Die Einsamkeit der Würstchen", "Ekelpack" as Die Geilen Greise under the title "Ich hab' Udo Lindenberg die Beine amputiert" ("I have amputated the legs from Udo Lindenberg")

Singles
1989: "Teenager Liebe (unecht)/Gute Nacht"

Personnel
Farin Urlaub – guitar, vocals
Bela Felsenheimer – drums, vocals
Hans Runge – bass guitar, vocals

Producers
"Ekelpack" and "Die Einsamkeit des Würstchens" by Jörg Fukking, Matthias Bröckel and Die Ulkigen Pulkigen1
"Tittenmaus" and "Wilde Mädchen" by David Heilmann and Die Ärzte
All other songs by Jörg Fukking, Matthias Bröckel and Die Ärzte

1 – Die Ulkigen Pulkigen is actually a pseudonym for Farin Urlaub and Bela B., used on a couple of compilations.

Charts

References

Die Ärzte compilation albums
1989 compilation albums